Animal Kingdom is an American drama television series developed by Jonathan Lisco, based on the 2010 Australian film by David Michôd. The series follows a 17-year-old boy (Finn Cole), who, after the death of his mother, moves in with the Codys, a criminal family clan governed by matriarch Janine "Smurf" Cody (Ellen Barkin). Animal Kingdom debuted on TNT on June 14, 2016.

On July 6, 2016, the series was renewed for a second season of thirteen episodes. On July 27, 2017, TNT renewed the series for a third season. On July 2, 2018, TNT renewed the series for a fourth season. On July 24, 2019, TNT renewed the series for a fifth season. On January 14, 2021, ahead of the fifth season premiere, TNT renewed the series for a sixth and final season. The final season premiered on June 19, 2022.

Series overview

Episodes

Season 1 (2016)

Season 2 (2017)

Season 3 (2018)
Episode 1 was the highest rated and most watched episode of the season and series.

Season 4 (2019)

Season 5 (2021)

Season 6 (2022)

Ratings

Season 1

Season 2

Season 3

Season 4

Season 5

Season 6

Notes

References

External links
 List of Animal Kingdom episodes at TNT
 

Lists of American crime drama television series episodes